Written by Jin Kusude and illustrated by Mitsuhisa Tamura, chapters of Pocket Monsters RéBURST has been serialized in Shogakukan's Weekly Shōnen Sunday magazine since March 9, 2011. The series has been collected into 8 tankōbon. The first volume was published on July 15, 2011 and latest on November 16, 2012.



Volume list

References

RéBURST